Liezel Huber and Lisa Raymond were the defending champions but decided not to participate together this year.
Huber played alongside Hsieh Su-wei, but lost to Daniela Hantuchová and Anabel Medina Garrigues in the first round while Raymond partnered up with Samantha Stosur, but lost to Raquel Kops-Jones and Abigail Spears in the quarterfinals.
Sara Errani and Roberta Vinci won the title, defeating Nadia Petrova and Katarina Srebotnik in the final 2–6, 6–3, [10–6].

Seeds
The first four seeds received byes into the second round.

Draw

Finals

Top half

Bottom half

References
 Main Draw

2013 WTA Tour
2013 Qatar Total Open – Doubles
2013 in Qatari sport